José Carlos Romero Herrera (born 1941) is a Spanish politician who served as Minister of Agriculture, Fisheries and Food from December 1982 to March 1991.

References

1941 births
Living people
Complutense University of Madrid alumni
Government ministers of Spain
20th-century Spanish politicians
Agriculture ministers of Spain